Bob Shannon may refer to:
 Bob Shannon (American football), high school football coach
 Bob Shannon (radio personality) (born 1948), radio name of current New York City area DJ Don Bombard
 R. J. Adams (1942–2015), another radio personality known as Bob Shannon

See also
Robert Shannon (disambiguation)